Triton Cove State Park is a public recreation covering  on Triton Cove at the southeastern corner of Jefferson County, Washington. The state park has  of saltwater shoreline on Hood Canal with facilities for picnicking, docking, diving, fishing, crabbing, and shellfish harvesting.

References

External links
Triton Cove State Park Washington State Parks and Recreation Commission 
Triton Cove State Park Map Washington State Parks and Recreation Commission

Parks in Jefferson County, Washington
State parks of Washington (state)
Protected areas established in 1990